A gravastar is an object hypothesized in astrophysics by Pawel O. Mazur and Emil Mottola as an alternative to the black hole theory. It has usual black hole metric outside of the horizon, but de Sitter metric inside. On the horizon there is a thin shell of matter. The term "gravastar" is a portmanteau of the words "gravitational vacuum star".

Structure 
In the original formulation by Mazur and Mottola, gravastars contain a central region featuring a  false vacuum or "dark energy", a thin shell of  perfect fluid, and a true vacuum  exterior. The dark energy-like behavior of the inner region prevents collapse to a singularity and the presence of the thin shell prevents the formation of an event horizon, avoiding the infinite blue shift. The inner region has thermodynamically no entropy and may be thought of as a gravitational Bose–Einstein condensate. Severe red-shifting of photons as they climb out of the gravity well would make the fluid shell also seem very cold, almost absolute zero.

In addition to the original thin shell formulation, gravastars with continuous pressure have been proposed. These objects must contain anisotropic stress.

Externally, a gravastar appears similar to a black hole: It is visible by the high-energy radiation it emits while consuming matter, and by the Hawking radiation it creates. Astronomers search the sky for X-rays emitted by infalling matter to detect black holes. A gravastar would produce an identical signature. It is also possible, if the thin shell is transparent to radiation, that gravastars may be distinguished from ordinary black holes by different gravitational lensing properties as null geodesics may pass through.

Mazur and Mottola suggest that the violent creation of a gravastar might be an explanation for the origin of our universe and many other universes, because all the matter from a collapsing star would implode "through" the central hole and explode into a new dimension and expand forever, which would be consistent with the current theories regarding the Big Bang. This "new dimension" exerts an outward pressure on the  Bose–Einstein condensate layer and prevents it from collapsing further.

Gravastars also could provide a mechanism for describing how dark energy accelerates the expansion of the universe. One possible hypothesis uses Hawking radiation as a means to exchange energy between the "parent" universe and the "child" universe, and so cause the rate of expansion to accelerate, but this area is under much speculation.

Gravastar formation may provide an alternate explanation for sudden and intense gamma-ray bursts throughout space.

LIGO's observations of gravitational waves from colliding objects have been found either to not be consistent with the gravastar concept, or to be indistinguishable from ordinary black holes.

In comparison with black holes
By taking quantum physics into account, the gravastar hypothesis attempts to resolve contradictions caused by conventional black hole theories.

Event horizons
In a gravastar, the event horizon is not present. The layer of positive pressure fluid would lie just outside the 'event horizon', being prevented from complete collapse by the inner false vacuum. Due to the absence of an event horizon the time coordinate of the exterior vacuum geometry is everywhere valid.

Dynamic stability of gravastars
In 2007, theoretical work indicated that under certain conditions gravastars as well as other alternative black hole models are not stable when they rotate. Theoretical work has also shown that certain  rotating gravastars are stable assuming certain angular velocities, shell thicknesses, and compactnesses. It is also possible that some gravastars which are mathematically unstable may be physically stable over cosmological timescales. Theoretical support for the feasibility of gravastars does not exclude the existence of black holes as shown in other theoretical studies.

See also
 Acoustic metric
 Acoustic Hawking radiation from sonic black holes
 Black star (semiclassical gravity)
 Dark-energy star

References

Further reading

 
  The original paper by Mazur and Mottola

External links
 Papers about gravastars on gr-qc

Stellar black holes
Black holes
Quantum gravity
Star types
Hypothetical stars
Fringe physics